This is a list of Indonesian football transfers in 2020. The transfer window  for football players is divided into two periods. In 2020, the first period ran from 7 February to 10 March, and the second from 20 July to 6 August.

Player regulation

Liga 1 
The regulations for players who play in Liga1 are as follows:

The club can register players with at least 18 players and at most 33 players. Clubs that participate in AFC and / or AFF competitions can register a maximum of 36 players.
Clubs are allowed to register 3 foreign players (non-citizens
Indonesia) and 1 additional foreign player (citizen of the AFC member).
The club is required to register at least 3 goalkeepers. For clubs that do not meet this provision, LIB has the right not to authorize all players registered.
The club can play U20 players in its main team at any time, as long as it has been approved in the Liga 1 U-20 registration period without reducing the 33/36 player quota.

Transfer 
All clubs without a flag are Indonesian clubs.

References 

Football in Indonesia